Tebaldo Bigliardi (born 5 February 1963) is an Italian former professional footballer who played as a defender. He made nearly 300 appearances in the top three divisions of Italian football, and was a member of Napoli's 1989 UEFA Cup Final-winning team.

Honours
Napoli
 Serie A champion: 1986–87, 1989–90
 Coppa Italia winner: 1986–87
 UEFA Cup winner: 1988–89

References

1963 births
Living people
Italian footballers
Association football defenders
Palermo F.C. players
S.S.C. Napoli players
Atalanta B.C. players
U.C. AlbinoLeffe players
Serie C players
Serie B players
Serie A players
UEFA Cup winning players
Footballers from Calabria
People from Catanzaro
Sportspeople from the Province of Catanzaro